Carmina Escobar (born 1981) is an experimental vocalist, improviser, performance artist, multimedia artist, and educator from Mexico City who lives and works in Los Angeles, California. Jeffrey Fleishman from the Los Angeles Times has written that Escobar "can make her voice sound like insects dancing on dry leaves or a rocket ship dying in space." She is on the VoiceArts faculty of the California Institute of the Arts where she teaches on "voice technique, experimental voice workshops, contemporary vocal music, and interdisciplinary projects regarding the voice".

Education 
Escobar studied music in the Escuela Superior de Música of the Instituto Nacional de Bellas Artes in Mexico City where she was trained through the classical canon, "but her soul and voice--she was labeled a soprano and mezzo-soprano--felt constricted by what she called music 'that’s mostly male, mostly European.'" These constrictions led her to explore other possibilities of the voice, extended techniques being a prominent one, and to seek additional training from artists living in Mexico City such as Hebe Rosell and Juan Pablo Villa. In the United States and in other locales, Escobar continued her vocal experimentation techniques with additional training with Jaqueline Bobak, Meredith Monk, Jaap Blonk. She is a graduate of the MFA program in VoiceArts at the California Institute of the Arts.

Pedagogy 
Escobar has trained students in vocal techniques within the California Institute of the Arts and beyond. Additionally, she has conducted workshops across the globe on voice, body resonance, and site-specific performance. With Micaela Tobin, Escobar is one of the founders and workshop facilitators of Howl Space, "a community-based learning resource that reframes vocal pedagogy through holistic, process-based approaches to discover the multi-faceted possibilities of the voice and unveil the creative process." Howl Space is nestled in teaching about the voice's capacities through radical pedagogy, as Escobar told Yxta Maya Murray in an interview for Artillery Magazine, "A radical pedagogy of the voice investigates not only the physical mechanics of its production, but also its ancestral trace. In our pedagogy, Micaela and I seek to understand the voice’s multiple possibilities by facilitating a space for its discovery and investigation. A radical pedagogy of the voice is also a tool to understand our world, to have agency in it, to express ourselves through art."

Production 
With Madeline Falcone, Escobar is the co-founder and co-director of Boss Witch Productions, "an artistic production company focused on the intersection of experimental sound art, ritual performance, video art, and transmedia collaboration with natural landscapes and unusual performance sites." Some of the projects that Boss Witch Productions has produced include Bajo la sombra del sol (2021-2022), Vox Clamantis (2021-2022), CalArts Gala at REDCAT (2022), among others.

Notable Work 
Beyond her teaching and production practice, Escobar has gained national and international recognition for her vocal, scenic, electronic music, and filmic work. In addition to performing in different festivals around the country and the world, Escobar has performed throughout Mexico, the United States, Cuba, and Puerto Rico, among other locations. Until the organization and community events space went defunct in 2018, her work was shown regularly with the Los Angeles based Machine Project. Some of Escobar's most recent work in Los Angeles has been produced by her production company, Boss Witch.

Escobar is also widely known for her body resonance work known as Massagem Sonora, which Fernando Vigueras has described as "a sort of exercise that analyses and reflects upon the body, understanding it as a space that reveals, measures and recognizes itself throughout its resonance." Massagem Sonora, or Sonic Massage, gained attention through its role in a large scale collaborative project in 2013 through the Getty Foundation's funded Pacific Standard Time Presents: Modern Architecture in L.A. and in tangent with The Machine Project Field Guide to LA Architecture.

Another piece initially produced by Machine Project was Escobar's large-scale site-specific performance spectacle Fiesta Perpetua! A Communitas Ritual of Manifestation in Los Angeles's Echo Park Lake on May 20, 2017, which was later re-staged as part of Pacific Standard Time Festival: Live Art LA/LA on January 13, 2018, funded by the Getty Foundation and organized by REDCAT. While the first iteration lasted all day, from dawn to dusk and moved, the second took place during one afternoon. Of Fiesta Perpetual! Yxta Maya Murray has said that Escobar "mesmerized a crowd of onlookers with a series of esoteric songs" as she was "accompanied by the 40-member Oaxacan youth brass band Maqueos Music, conducted by Yulissa Maqueos" and the Japanese butoh dancer Oguri. Inspired by traditional processional events in Mexico, Fiesta Perpetua! was conceived less of a spectacle to be taken in by the "onlookers" and more as a series of ritualized movements throughout the space where the audience became participants. It was, as Carolina A. Miranda wrote, "a performance that felt a little bit like a stirring rite that transforms into an impromptu neighborhood party."

Escobar is the co-founder and was a long-term vocalist of LIMINAR, a contemporary music ensemble based in Mexico City. As noted by Alejandro Madrid in his book In Search of Julián Carrillo and Sonido 13, Escobar was instrumental in LIMINAR's performance of Julián Carrillo's Preludio a Colón, which is said to best exemplify Carrillo's microtonal music theory known as Sonido 13. Their first performance of the piece took place on July 4, 2013 in Mexico City. LIMINAR's United States' performance of this landmark piece, along with other Carrillo and Carrillo inspired compositions, took place in Los Angeles's REDCAT on December 11–12, 2015. Of Escobar's performance Mark Swed wrote: "the greatest novelty is heard in a soprano part that could be the soundtrack for a séance and was sung with startling expressivity and purity by Carmina Escobar."

In 2018 Escobar premiered her performance piece, Pura Entraña / Pure Gut, developed during her residency at MacDowell and in collaboration Mexican instrument maker and musician Jerónimo Naranjo who known for his Piano Suspendido (Suspended Piano). Escobar and her collaborators, which consisted of musicians, instrumentalists, and dancers—among them Naranjo, Dorian Wood, the Oaxacan youth brass band Maqueos Music, Oguri, Roxanne Steinberg—activated the installation of the Piano Suspendido that hovered 6 feet above Los Angeles' REDCAT's stage floor and created a surrealist sonic and visual journey into the entrails of the installation for the spectators.

An equally or perhaps more ambitious project, Bajo la sombra del sol / Under the Sun's Shadow, a Boss Witch Production, premiered in 2021 also in REDCAT and it consisted of a immersive installation and film projection alongside live performance by an ensemble of artists from different disciplines: music, voice, dance. As described on the REDCAT's website, Bajo la sombra del sol "is a performative hypertextural scenic work by Carmina Escobar that is staged, makes communion with, and gathers multimedia material at the natural landscape of Mono Lake, California." This multimedia material gathered can be considered an experimental film that Escobar directed in Mono Lake under great duress, the Covid-19 pandemic and the fires that raged throughout California during the summer of 2021. But the locale of Mono Lake, which has been "relentlessly whittled into its current state of environmental calamity by humans," was the perfect site to explore one of Escobar's artistic and philosophical interests, the "concept of darkness, of the shadow, of inhabiting shadows and casting shadows." For Bajo la sombra del sol Escobar brought back two key collaborators, Jerónimo Naranjo who constructed a series of instruments, including a large-scale drum that stands as proxy for the sun, and Dorian Wood who is a central character in the piece, both the film and live version, alongside other past and new collaborating artists.

Grants and Residencies 
Escobar has been awarded several grants and residencies including the Performer's Grant by the National Endowment of the Arts in Mexico twice, the 2014 NFA Master Artist Grant, the MacDowell residency in 2018, the Foundation for Contemporary Arts in Music/Sound in 2020, the National Performance Network Creation Fund Award in 2020, the Bemis Center for Contemporary Arts residency in 2021.

Recordings and Publications 

 People's Historia, with Estamos Trio (Relative Pitch, 2013)
 TZATZI (A Wave Press, 2017)
 Dire Warning, with Estamos Trio (Relative Pitch, 2020)
 Feast of Beams, Keepers of Light, co-edited with Madison Heying and Laura Steenberge (Indexical, 2020)

References

External links 
Official Website
Vimeo Page
Soundcloud Page
Boss Witch Productions
Howl Space

Mexican women singers
Living people
Singers from Mexico City
California Institute of the Arts faculty
Experimental musicians
1981 births
Performance artists